"One Hour to Madness and Joy" is an 1860 poem by Walt Whitman.

References 

Poetry by Walt Whitman
1860 poems